Enova may refer to:

Enova SF, a Norwegian government enterprise responsible for promotion of environmentally friendly production and consumption of energy
L'Ènova, a municipality in the province of Valencia, Spain, also known as Énova